Lleyton Hewitt was the defending champion but did not compete that year.

Andre Agassi won in the final 6–3, 6–1 against Davide Sanguinetti.

Seeds
A champion seed is indicated in bold text while text in italics indicates the round in which that seed was eliminated.

  Andre Agassi (champion)
  Paradorn Srichaphan (first round)
  James Blake (semifinals)
  Jan-Michael Gambill (second round)
  Todd Martin (second round)
  Davide Sanguinetti (final)
  Nikolay Davydenko (quarterfinals)
  Kenneth Carlsen (quarterfinals)

Draw

External links
 2003 Siebel Open Draw

SAP Open
2003 ATP Tour